Fa-Yueh Wu (January 5, 1932 – January 21, 2020) was a Chinese-born theoretical physicist, mathematical physicist, and mathematician who studied and contributed to solid-state physics and statistical mechanics.

Life

Early stage 
Born on January 5, 1932, in Shimen County, Hunan Province, Republic of China, with his father, a member of the Legislature, as his fourth child. The temporary capital of the Chiang Kai-shek administration of Nationalist government was placed in Chongqing in December 1938, but before that, in 1937, he evacuated to Chongqing with his father and stepmother and entered an elementary school there. However, due to repeated Bombing of Chongqing, he was unable to settle in one place. In 1943, he enrolled in Nankai Junior High School, which was evacuated to Chongqing at the time. He transferred to a high school in Nanjing, which became the capital of Chiang Kai-shek administration again in 1946, after the collapse of Wang Jingwei regime. In 1948 he moved to Changsha and transferred to another junior high school. In 1949, he fled to Taiwan with his father and stepmother due to the Chinese Civil War, but separated from the four siblings who remained on the continent. His parents died without being able to resume with their children.

Republic of China Navy 
He enrolled in the Republic of China Navy Mechanical School in 1949, entered the Department of Electrical Engineering a year later, earned a bachelor's degree in 1954, served in the Republic of China Navy from 1954 to 1956, and became a lieutenant in the Navy. In 1955, he was selected to study radar engineering for half a year in San Francisco, USA. He was an expert of radar and sonar. He was also a master of Xiangqi.

Physics 
He entered the National Tsing Hua University in 1957 and received a master's degree from the Institute of Atomic Sciences Physics Group in June 1959. He then went to the United States on a scholarship to study many-body problems  under Eugene Feenberg at Washington University in St. Louis, and received his PhD in 1963.  He was an assistant professor at Virginia Tech in 1963 and Northeastern University in 1967, an associate professor in 1969, and a professor in 1975. He has been a university professor since 1989 and Matthews professor since 1992. He has numerous academic treatises. After he retired in 2006, he became an emeritus professor. He died at his home in Newton, Massachusetts, on January 21, 2020.

Notes

Books 
 Lieb, Wu Two dimensional ferroelectric models. In: Domb, Green (Hrsg.): Phase transitions and critical phenomena. Band 1. Academic Press, 1972, S. 331–490 (Vertex-Modelle)
 The Potts Model. In: Reviews of Modern Physics, Band 54, 1982, S. 235–268
 Knot theory and statistical mechanics. In: Reviews of Modern Physics, Band 64, 1992, S. 1099–1131
 Knot invariants and statistical mechanics- a physicists perspective. In: M. Ge, C.-N. Yang (Hrsg.): Braid group, knot theory and statistical mechanics. World Scientific, 1993
 Exactly solvable models – a journey in statistical mechanics. Selected Papers with commentaries. World Scientific, 2009 (In: Chinese Journal of Physics, Band 40, 2002, No. 4)

External links 
 Maillard: A challenge in enumerative combinatorics: the graph of contributions of Prof. Fa-Yueh Wu. 2002,  

1932 births
2020 deaths
People from Changde
American physicists
American mathematicians
Chinese physicists
Chinese mathematicians
Chinese emigrants to the United States
National Tsing Hua University alumni
Washington University in St. Louis alumni
Virginia Tech faculty
Northeastern University faculty